Peter the Painter, also known as Peter Piaktow (or Piatkov, Pjatkov, Piaktoff), was a member of a gang of immigrant Latvian anarchists in London in the early 20th century. After supposedly fighting in and escaping the Sidney Street Siege in 1911, he became an anti-hero in London's East End. He was never caught, and there is some question as to whether he had participated in the Sidney Street incident, or even whether he actually existed at all.

Biography
In the late 19th and early 20th centuries London became a destination for many eastern European immigrants, who settled mostly in the East End. Ethnic groups joined together in gangs, and numerous immigrants continued radical political activities. They often stole in order to fund their politics. In the wake of the Houndsditch Murders in London on 16 December 1910, a member of the gang involved was found dead at a flat at which Peter Piatkow had lived with Fritz Svaars. Both of the latter men were believed to be members of a Latvian radical group. Svaars was the cousin of Jacob Peters, another Latvian far-leftist. In January 1911 the police were informed that Svaars and an accomplice were hiding out at 100 Sidney Street. They surrounded the area and laid siege to the building in order to flush out the radicals.

Another member was "Peter the Painter", a nickname for an unknown figure, possibly named Peter Piaktow (or Piatkov, Pjatkov or Piaktoff), He used several aliases, including Schtern, Straume, Makharov and Dudkin or Janis Zhaklis. Bernard Porter, writing in the Dictionary of National Biography, states that no firm details are known of the anarchist's background and that "None of the ... biographical 'facts' about him ... is altogether reliable."

In 1988, based on research in the KGB archives, Philip Ruff, a historian of anarchism, suggested Peter the Painter might be Ģederts Eliass. He was a Latvian artist involved in the 1905 Revolution in Russia and was living in exile in England during the time of the Sidney Street Siege. He returned to Riga after the Bolshevik 1917 Revolution.  More recently, Ruff has identified Peter the Painter as Jānis Žāklis (also spelled Janis Zhaklis or Zhakles), another Latvian far-leftist.  Like Peters, Zhaklis was a member of the Latvian Social Democratic Workers' Party in 1905; among his exploits was effecting the escape of Fritz Svaars from prison in Riga. Zhaklis associated with Eliass in exile in Finland, where they were involved together in the robbery of the Russian State Bank branch in Helsinki. Zhaklis broke with the Social Democrats and became an anarchist. It is unclear what happened to him after 1911.  In August 2012 Ruff published a book on the life of Janis Zhaklis; it was released by Dienas Grāmata (in Latvian) as Pa stāvu liesmu debesīs: Nenotveramā latviešu anarhista Pētera Māldera laiks un dzīve (A Towering Flame: The Life & Times of Peter the Painter). This has been succeeded by an English-language edition, published by Breviary Stuff in 2019.

Legacy and honours
The type of gun which Peter the Painter allegedly used at Sidney Street, a German Mauser C96 pistol, was sometimes called a Peter the Painter after him, particularly in Ireland during the War of Independence and later.
In September 2008 Tower Hamlets London Borough Council named two tower blocks in Sidney Street, Peter House and Painter House, even though Peter the Painter was only involved in a minor capacity in the events, and was not present at the siege. A local councillor and the Metropolitan Police Federation protested against this, saying that the killer should not be recognised.
Miss Fisher’s Murder Mysteries, a series about a female detective from the past in Australia, has an episode (s1 e4) which includes Peter the Painter as a major figure

Notes

Bibliography

External links
Audio from a talk on Peter The Painter by Phil Ruff for Bristol Radical History Group
Peter the Painter (Janis Zhaklis) and the Siege of Sidney Street by Pauls Bankovskis and Phil Ruff

20th-century Latvian people
Latvian criminals
People whose existence is disputed
Latvian expatriates in the United Kingdom
Year of birth unknown
Year of death unknown
Latvian anarchists